Johann Becker (1 September 1726 – 1803) was a German organist, teacher, and composer, born in Helsa- near Kassel. He studied with Johann Sebastian Bach in Leipzig from about 1745 to 1748. He taught in Hartmuthsachsen, and Kassel, where in 1761 he was appointed municipal organist. In 1770 he was appointed court organist. He wrote mainly church music.

References
Oxford Composer Companions, J. S. Bach, 1999, p. 60

1726 births
1803 deaths
German classical organists
German male organists
German Classical-period composers
18th-century keyboardists
German male classical composers
People from Kassel (district)
19th-century German male musicians
Male classical organists